Eudasyphora cyanella is a species of fly. It is a common species in England and Wales and is most commonly found in April and May.

References

Muscidae
Diptera of Europe
Taxa named by Johann Wilhelm Meigen
Insects described in 1826